Spencer Jones is a lunar impact crater on the Moon's far side. It is a roughly circular feature with a rim edge that is only moderately eroded. The inner wall of Spencer Jones is wider than elsewhere. The interior floor is relatively level with a low ridge offset to the south of the midpoint. Attached to the southwestern outer rim is the small satellite crater Spencer Jones Q.

It is named after British astronomer Harold Spencer Jones.

Just over 20 km from Spencer Jones is the slightly smaller crater Papaleksi to the south-southwest. To the northeast lies Anderson.

The crater lies at the southwest margin of the Freundlich-Sharonov Basin.

Satellite craters
By convention these features are identified on lunar maps by placing the letter on the side of the crater midpoint that is closest to Spencer Jones.

References

 
 
 
 
 
 
 
 
 
 
 
 

Impact craters on the Moon